The Origin – A, B, Or What? is a 2022 survival program created by IST Entertainment in association with its parent company, Kakao Entertainment, and Sony Music Entertainment Japan. It aired on MBN, Kakao TV and 1theK YouTube channel on March 19, 2022, every Saturday at 18:00 (KST) timeslot for eight episodes. In the finale on May 7, 2022, the show announced the final 7 members who would debut as ATBO.

Background and concept
On February 6, it was reported that IST Entertainment, home to male idol groups Victon and The Boyz as well as female idol group Apink and Weeekly, is making their first boy group under the new company name in the first half of the year.

On February 10, It was announced that IST will be forming their boy group under a survival program titled, The Origin – A, B, Or What?. It will be jointly produced with Kakao Entertainment and Sony Music Solutions. The show will consist of 13 contestants.

On February 22, IST announced that the premiere date was postponed from February 26 to March 19 due to some trainees who tested positive for COVID-19.

Cast
The show is presented by Park Seon-young. Meanwhile, the judges, dubbed as "balancers", are:

Jay B
Minzy
Sungkyu
Kwak Yoon-young
Hwang Kyu-hong
Guests
 The Boyz (Episode 3)
 Jay Park (Special Balancer, Episode 6–7)
 Apink's Bomi, Hayoung (Special Balancer, Episode 6–7)
 Victon's Sejun, Subin (Special Balancer, Episode 6–7)

Contestants 
Color key:

Profile
The ages of all contestants are presented in accordance with the international age system as of Episode 1 (March 19, 2022).

Missions

PR Balance 
Teams were formed prior Episode 1. There are two rounds to this mission.

The Death participant from the losing team will be eliminated. Both teams' Aces received the benefit to lead and form the teams for the next mission.

Color key

 Winning team

 Leader

 Ace

 Death

 Leader & Ace

Concept Balance 
Teams were formed in Episode 2.

The losing team, with the exception of the Ace, and the Death participant of the winning team will be eliminated.

Like the previous round, the selected Aces also automatically led and formed the new teams for the next round.

Color key

 Winning team

 Leader

 Ace

 Death

The ace card of the losing team exchange fates with the death card of the winning team making Ryu Junmin part of the saved members and Won Bin on the run for elimination.

Survival Balance 
This mission was given to eliminated contestants in order to reverse their elimination. The participants were given 30 minutes by the Balancers to prepare a performance.

The chosen two Death contestants by the Balancers will be fully removed from the show.

Color key

 Death

Final Balance

Battle Round 
Teams were formed in Episode 5. Performances were shown on Episode 5. Results were revealed on Episode 7.

The winning team will receive 100 points for five members. Each Ace will receive a bonus of 100 points, giving the victorious team's Ace total of 200 points. The winning team's Death trainee will earn no points, while the losing team's Death trainee will incur a 100-point deduction, putting them at a disadvantage.

Color key

 Winning team

 Leader

 Ace

 Death

Origin Round 
In this round, the live audiences voted for each trainee individually. They can vote for multiple trainees, but they cannot vote for the same trainee multiple times. Each Balancer selects which trainees receive the Ace card, which is worth 50 points, and the Death card, which deducts 50 points.

 points were not shown for the eliminated and final two members (Yang Donghwa and Kim Yeonkyu).

Episodes

Episode 1 (March 19, 2022)
The show opened up with a performance of "Run", which is the signal song by all 13 contestants. The judges, known as balancers, were then introduced. The concept of the show was then explained by the MC Park Seon-young. It was also revealed that one member of the losing team will be eliminated.

For the first round, called the PR balance round, Team A performed "Mic Drop" by BTS while Team B performed "Hala Hala" by Ateez. Following each team's performance, the balancers voted for the best (Ace) and worst contestant (Death) of each team. The on-site audience then also voted for the best team performance with Team B winning the on-site voting. However, the final result will be decided through a combined points system.

Episode 2 (March 26, 2022)

Episode 3 (April 2, 2022)

Episode 4 (April 10, 2022)

Episode 5 (April 16, 2022)

Episode 6 (April 23, 2022)

Episode 7 (April 30, 2022) 
Team B wins the first round of the final balance game and the members receive 100 points, except Jeong Seung-hwan, who gets the Death card and receives no points, and Yang Dong-hwa, who is chosen as the Ace and thus receives 200 points. In Team A, Oh Jun-seok receives 100 points as the Ace of his group, while Jun-ho receives minus 100 points as the Balancers deems him the most unconvincing. Then, the trainees are given a day off and are taken to a vacation house in the mountains, where they play games and enjoy a barbecue party. In the evening, they are joined by Jay Park, who gives them words of advice over dinner; the trainees conclude the night watching video messages they have previously recorded for each other.

Episode 8 (May 7, 2022)

Ranking 
The first five members were chosen from the final stage points, Ace and Death card points, and Balancers' assessment. The last two members were chosen by the Balancers.

Discography

Singles

Ratings
In the table below, the blue numbers represent the lowest ratings and the red numbers represent the highest ratings.

Aftermath
On June 13 2022, IST Entertainment announced that Yang Donghwa would not be debuting as a member of ATBO after his past misconduct, when he was a student surfaced online.
On June 17, 2022, IST Entertainment announced that Won Bin who is originally eliminated in ep 5, would be debuting with ATBO in replacement of Donghwa.
ATBO debut on July 27.

Some trainees joined new agencies:
Kang Dae-hyun joined Urban Works Media.
Jeong Jun-ho and Yang Dong-hwa joined Cube Entertainment.
Kim Min-seo and Park Jae-hoon joined Fantagio.
Some trainees opened social media accounts:
Choi Jin-wook opened a personal Instagram account & Tiktok.
Kang Dae-hyun opened a personal Instagram account.
Some trainees participated in other survival shows:
Kang Dae-hyun to participate in MBC's "Fantasy Boys".

Notes

References

K-pop television series
Reality music competition television series
South Korean music television shows
2022 South Korean television series debuts
Korean-language television shows
Music competitions in South Korea
South Korean reality television series
South Korean variety television shows
IST Entertainment
Sony Music Entertainment Japan
2022 South Korean television series endings